The Acoustic Motorbike is the second album by the Irish folk musician Luka Bloom, released in 1992. Its title refers to a joke made by Moore, comparing himself to the "Harley Davidson" that is Eddie Van Halen.

Production
Recorded in Dublin, the album was produced by Paul Barrett. It includes cover versions of LL Cool J's "I Need Love" and Elvis Presley's "Can't Help Falling in Love". Bloom's brother, Christy Moore, played on the album, as did members of Hothouse Flowers.

Bloom used two acoustic guitars, named Rudy and Judy, on The Acoustic Motorbike, often in conjunction with effects pedals. The title track is about bicycling through Ireland; "Listen to the Hoofbeat" is about the mistreatment of Native Americans. Bloom rapped on a few of the album's songs.

Critical reception

Trouser Press wrote that the album "leans towards fuller, band-oriented instrumentation ... but it's unfocused, not entirely abandoning Riverside'''s simple melodicism but not forwarding that album's strengths, either." The Washington Post thought that Bloom's "new songs boast a restraint and focus that serve his husky voice and high-energy guitar strumming much better than his earlier overblown epics." The Indianapolis Star labeled The Acoustic Motorbike "bouncy and funny, and worth a few more listens."Entertainment Weekly opined that "Bloom’s most audacious move is a straight-faced cover of L.L. Cool J's rap ballad 'I Need Love', complete with gently thumping Celtic drum and fiddle ... That it's the most striking cut on the album only serves to pinpoint Bloom's deficiencies." Spin deemed the title track "an environmental-age 'Magic Bus', a one-chord novelty tune that at this point is Bloom's best chance for cult success." The Calgary Herald concluded that "Bloom writes about the ridiculous exercise of living, openly confused at times, presuming nothing." The Chicago Tribune'' panned the "self-absorbed musings about love and life."

AllMusic wrote that "while Bloom's second album expanded somewhat on his first record's stylistic range and maintained its urgency, it lacked the debut's exuberance."

Track listing

Charts

References

1992 albums
Reprise Records albums